Sonny Bravo (born  October 7, 1936), born Elio Osacar, is an Afro-Cuban jazz and Latin jazz pianist. He was once a very good baseball player with many prospects born in New York, New York, though due to an injury in 1956 he sought out a career in music. It was then he started performing with Many Campo, El Casino de Miami, José Fajardo and many others. He also recorded with Tito Puente and Bobby Paunetto.

Discography
With Tito Nieves
 Felicitaciones (Lo Mejor, 1980)
 Si No Bailan Con Ellos, No Bailan Con Nadie (Lo Mejor, 1981)
 Las Puertas Abiertas (Lo Mejor, 1983)

With Johnny Pacheco
 Llego Melon (Vaya, 1977)
 Los Dos Mosqueteros (Vaya, 1977)
 Pacheco y Fajardo (Fania, 1982)

With Tito Puente
 Mambo Diablo (Concord Jazz Picante, 1985)
 Sensacion (Concord Jazz Picante, 1986)
 Un Poco Loco (Concord Jazz Picante, 1987)
 Salsa Meets Jazz (Concord Picante, 1988)
 Live at Birdland Dancemania '99 (RMM, 1998)
 Goza Mi Timbal (Concord Picante, 1990)
 Out of This World (Concord Picante, 1991)
 The Mambo King: 100th LP (RMM, 1991)
 Mambo of the Times (Concord Jazz Picante, 1992)
 Royal T (Concord Picante, 1993)
 Master Timbalero (Concord Picante, 1994)
 Tito's Idea (TropiJazz, 1995)
 Special Delivery (Concord Jazz Picante, 1996)
 Mambo Birdland (RMM, 1999)
 Masterpiece/Obra Maestra (Universal, 2000)

With Típica 73
 Típica 73 (Inca, 1972)
 La Típica 73 Vol 2 (Inca, 1974)
 La Candela (Inca, 1975)
 Rumba Caliente (Inca, 1976)
 Pare Cochero/Gandinga (Inca, 1976)
 Rumba Caliente/Guaguanco De Los Violentos (Inca, 1976)
 The Two Sides of 'Típica 73 (Inca, 1977)
 Salsa Encendida (Inca, 1978)
 En Cuba Intercambio Cultural (Fania, 1979)
 Charangueando Con La Típica 73 (Fania, 1980)
 Típica 73...Into the 80's (Fania, 1981)

With others
 George Benson & Joe Farrell, Benson & Farrell (CTI, 1976)
 Justo Betancourt, Leguleya No (Fania, 1982)
 Ruben Blades, Metiendo Mano! (Fania, 1977)
 Bill Cosby, Where You Lay Your Head (Verve, 1990)
 Joe Cuba, Cocinando La Salsa (Fania, 2008)
 Alfredo de la Fé, Para Africa Con Amor (Sacodis, 1979)
 Alfredo de la Fé, Charanga Caliente (Envidia, 2003)
 Dimension Latina, Combinacion Latina No. 4 (Velvet, 1979)
 Dimension Latina, Tremenda Dimension! (Eco, 1981)
 Jose Fajardo, El Talento Total (Coco, 1977)
 Terry Gibbs, The Latin Connection (Contemporary, 1986)
 La Lupe, En Algo Nuevo (Tico, 1980)
 Mongo Santamaria, Ubane (Vaya, 1976)
 Orquesta Broadway, Paraiso (Coco, 1981)
 Louie Ramirez, Louie Ramirez Y Sus Amigos (Cotique, 1978)
 Louie Ramirez, Salsero (Cotique, 1980)
 Hector Ramos, Para Todo El Mundo 7th (Galaxy, 1983)
 Johnny Rodriguez, El Encuentro (Lo Mejor, 1982)
 Jimmy Sabater, Solo (Tico, 1969)
 Jimmy Sabater, Gusto (Fania, 1980)
 Daniel Santos, Daniel Santos Con El Conjunto Clasico (Velvet, 1985)
 Janis Siegel, Experiment in White (Wounded Bird, 2002)
 Los Tres, Los Tres (Polydor, 1983)

References

Afro-Cuban jazz pianists
Latin jazz pianists
1936 births
Living people
21st-century pianists